Sukhadia may refer to:

 Mohan Lal Sukhadia (1916–1982), Indian politician belonging to Udaipur
 Indubala Sukhadia (1921–1999), wife, social, and political leader of Rajasthan
 Sukhadia Circle, a popular recreational centre in Udaipur
 Mohanlal Sukhadia University, a public university situated in Udaipur
 Sukhadia Stadium